The 120 members of the ninth Knesset were elected on 17 May 1977. The breakdown by party was as follows:
Likud: 43
Alignment: 32
Democratic Movement for Change: 15
National Religious Party: 12
Hadash: 5
Agudat Yisrael: 4
United Arab List: 1
Flatto-Sharon: 1*
Shlomtzion: 2
Left Camp of Israel: 2
Poalei Agudat Yisrael: 1
Ratz: 1
Independent Liberals: 1

* Flatto-Sharon won enough votes for two seats, but was a one-man list

List of members

Replacements

External links
Members of the Ninth Knesset Knesset website

 
09